Jules Lecoutre (24 April 1878 – 18 April 1962) was a French gymnast. He competed in the men's individual all-around event at the 1900 Summer Olympics.

References

External links

1878 births
1962 deaths
French male artistic gymnasts
Olympic gymnasts of France
Gymnasts at the 1900 Summer Olympics
Sportspeople from Tourcoing
French people in French Algeria